Yevgeniya  Konstantinovna Glushenko (born on September 4, 1952 in Rostov-na-Donu) is a Russian actress, best known for her role as Vera in the Soviet melodrama Love by Request (1983). This role brought her international recognition with the Silver Bear for Best Actress at the 33rd Berlin International Film Festival in 1983.

Glushenko was raised in Rostov-on-Don  and graduated  from the Mikhail Shchepkin Higher Theatre School in Moscow  in 1974. Since her graduation she has worked for the Moscow Maly Theater.

In Pavel Chukhrai’s psychological perestroika drama  Zina-Zinulya (1986), Glushenko plays a young and complex woman, working as a dispatcher of cement trucks for a construction firm, turning her apathetic and insensitive  colleagues into socially conscious people.
She has had supporting roles in movies by Nikita Mikhalkov, including A Few Days in the Life of Oblomov (1979) and An Unfinished Piece for Mechanical Piano (1977).

Glushenko's most recent film release is Farewell in 2003.
Her husband is popular Russian actor and theatrical director Alexander Kalyagin. Yevgeniya Glushenko became a People's Artist of Russia in 1995.

References

External links

Biography 

1952 births
Living people
Actors from Rostov-on-Don
Soviet film actresses
Soviet stage actresses
Soviet television actresses
Russian film actresses
Russian stage actresses
Russian television actresses
Silver Bear for Best Actress winners
20th-century Russian actresses
21st-century Russian actresses
People's Artists of Russia
State Prize of the Russian Federation laureates